Valentina Srša (born 16 January 1986) is a Croatian hammer thrower, who won an individual gold medal at the Youth World Championships.

References

External links

1986 births
Living people
Croatian female hammer throwers
21st-century Croatian women
20th-century Croatian women